Syntretini is a tribe of parasitic wasps in the subfamily Euphorinae.

References 

 Phylogeny of the parasitic wasp subfamily Euphorinae (Braconidae) and evolution of its host preferences. 
 

Euphorinae
Parasitica tribes